The 2019 Eliteserien was the 75th season of top-tier football in Norway. This was third season of Eliteserien as rebranding from Tippeligaen.

The season began on 30 March and was scheduled to end 30 November 2019, not including play-off matches, but due to Rosenborg competing in the Europa League the final matchday was moved to 1 December. Fixtures for the 2019 season were announced on 19 December 2018. Rosenborg were the defending champions. Viking and Mjøndalen joined as the promoted clubs from the 2018 1. divisjon. They replaced Sandefjord and Start who were relegated to the 2019 1. divisjon.

Molde won their fourth title, with two matches to spare following a 4–0 home win against Strømsgodset on 10 November 2019.

Overview

Summary
On 10 November, Molde were confirmed as Eliteserien champions following their 4–0 home win against Strømsgodset in the 28th round. They won their fourth title.

Teams
Sixteen teams compete in the league – the top fourteen teams from the previous season, and two teams promoted from 1. divisjon. The promoted teams were Viking and Mjøndalen, returning to the top flight after an absence of one and three years respectively. They replaced Sandefjord (after a two-year spell in Eliteserien) and Start (relegated after a season's presence).

Stadiums and locations

Note: Table lists in alphabetical order.

Personnel and kits

Managerial changes

Transfers

Winter

Summer

League table

Positions by round

Relegation play-offs

The 14th-placed team, Lillestrøm takes part in a two-legged play-off against Start, the winners of the 1. divisjon promotion play-offs, to decide who will play in the 2020 Eliteserien.

Lillestrøm lost on the away goals rule after 5–5 on aggregate and were relegated to 1. divisjon.

Results

Season statistics

Top scorers

Hat-tricks

Top assists

Clean sheets

Discipline

Player

Most yellow cards: 8
 Zlatko Tripić (Viking)

Most red cards: 1
 Mohammed Abu (Vålerenga)
 Amin Askar (Sarpsborg 08)
 Fitim Azemi (Vålerenga)
 Fredrik André Bjørkan (Bodø/Glimt)
 Tobias Borchgrevink Børkeeiet (Stabæk)
 Vadim Demidov (Stabæk)
 Aron Dønnum (Vålerenga)
 Mikael Ingebrigtsen (Tromsø)
 Jesper Isaksen (Kristiansund)
 Mike Jensen (Rosenborg)
 Efraín Juárez (Vålerenga)
 Torbjørn Kallevåg (Haugesund)
 Kyle Lafferty (Sarpsborg 08)
 Ohi Omoijuanfo (Molde)
 Marcus Holmgren Pedersen (Tromsø)
 Usman Sale (Viking)
 Sheriff Sinyan (Lillestrøm)
 Alexander Søderlund (Rosenborg)
 Joackim Olsen Solberg (Mjøndalen)
 Ole Amund Sveen (Bodø/Glimt)

Club

Most yellow cards: 55  
Molde

Most red cards: 4
Vålerenga

League attendances

Awards

See also
 2019 Norwegian Football Cup

References

Eliteserien seasons
0
Norway
Norway